De Schalsumermolen is a smock mill in Schalsum, Friesland, Netherlands which was built in 1801. The mill has been restored to working order. Used as a training mill, it is listed as a Rijksmonument.

History
De Schalsumermolen was built in 1801 to drain the Grote Schalsumer Polder. The mill was working until 1960, and since then it has been maintained in an operable condition, last working in the 1970s. De Schalsumermolen was sold to Stichting De Fryske Mole on 28 December 1977, the 20th mill bought by that organisation. In 1979, the mill was restored. New Common sails were fitted, replacing the previous Patent sails. The mill is listed as a Rijksmonument, №15880. The mill is used by the Gild Fryske Mounders to train people in the art of working windmills.

Description

De Schalsumermolen is what the Dutch describe as a Grondzeiler. It is a two storey smock mill on a single storey base. There is no stage, the sails reaching almost to ground level. The mill is winded by tailpole and winch. The smock and cap are thatched. The sails are Common sails. The sails are carried on a cast iron windshaft, which was cast by Koninklijke Nederlandsche Grofsmederij, Leiden, North Holland in 1901. The windshaft carries the brake wheel which has 55 cogs. This drives the wallower (30 cogs) at  the top of the upright shaft. At the bottom of the upright shaft there are two crown wheels The upper crown wheel, which has 42 cogs drives an Archimedes' screw via a crown wheel. The lower crown wheel, which has 36 cogs is carried on the axle of an Archimedes' screw, which is used to drain the polder. The screw is  diameter. It is inclined at 20.5°. Each revolution of the screw lifts  of water.

Public access
De Schalsumermolen is open to the public on Saturday afternoons or by appointment.

References

Windmills in Friesland
Windmills completed in 1801
Smock mills in the Netherlands
Windpumps in the Netherlands
Agricultural buildings in the Netherlands
Rijksmonuments in Friesland
Octagonal buildings in the Netherlands
Waadhoeke